James Lavin (1928 – 5 September 2020) was an Irish Gaelic footballer and hurler. At club level he played with the St Vincent's club and was a two-time National League winner at senior level with the Dublin county football team.

Playing career
Born in Dublin, Lavin was educated at O'Connell Schools, with whom he also played in the Dr. Croke Cup against St Flannan's College in 1946. By that stage he had also joined the Dublin minor team as a dual player, winning back-to-back All-Ireland Championships as a hurler in 1945 and as a footballer in 1946. After a spell with the Dublin junior football team, Lavin was drafted onto the senior team in 1949. Over the following eight years he won two National Football League medals and a Leinster Championship medal. Lavin also played club football with St Vincent's and won ten Dublin County Championships between 1949 and 1959.

Honours
St Vincent's
Dublin Senior Football Championship (10): 1949, 1950, 1951, 1952, 1953, 1954, 1955, 1957, 1958, 1959

Dublin
Leinster Senior Football Championship (1): 1955
National League (2): 1952-53, 1954-55

References

1928 births
2020 deaths
Dual players
Dublin inter-county Gaelic footballers
Dublin inter-county hurlers
Gaelic football backs
St Vincents (Dublin) Gaelic footballers
St Vincents (Dublin) hurlers